The  is a mid-size car (compact in Northern American markets) built by Toyota which has a hybrid drivetrain, combining an internal combustion engine with an electric motor. Initially offered as a four-door sedan, it has been produced only as a five-door liftback since 2003.

In 2007, the United States Environmental Protection Agency (EPA) and California Air Resources Board (CARB) rated the Prius as among the cleanest vehicles sold in the United States on the basis of smog-forming emissions. The 2018 model year Prius Eco ranked as the second-most-fuel-efficient gasoline-powered car without plug-in capability available in the US that year, following the Hyundai Ioniq Blue hybrid.

The Prius first went on sale in Japan in 1997, and was available at all four Toyota Japan dealership chains, making it the first mass-produced hybrid vehicle. It was subsequently introduced worldwide in 2000. Toyota sells the Prius in over 90 markets, with Japan and the United States being its largest markets. Global cumulative Prius liftback sales reached the milestone 1 million vehicle mark in May 2008, 2 million in September 2010, and passed the 3 million mark in June 2013. Cumulative sales of one million were achieved in the U.S. by early April 2011, and Japan reached the 1 million mark in August 2011. , the Prius  ranked as the world's top selling hybrid car with 5 million units sold.

In 2011, Toyota expanded the Prius family to include the Prius v, an MPV, and the Prius c, a subcompact hatchback. The production version of the Prius plug-in hybrid was released in 2012. The second generation of the plug-in variant, the Prius Prime, was released in the U.S. in November 2016. The Prime achieved the highest miles per gallon equivalent (MPGe) rating in all-electric mode of any vehicle rated by EPA with an internal combustion engine. Global sales of the Prius c variant passed the one million mark during the first half of 2015. The Prius family totaled global cumulative sales of 6.1 million units in January 2017, representing 61% of the 10 million hybrids sold worldwide by Toyota since 1997.

Etymology and terminology 
Prius is a Latin word meaning "first", "original", "superior" or "to go before".

In February 2011, Toyota USA asked the US public to decide on what the most proper plural form of Prius should be, with choices including Prien, Prii, Prium, Prius, or Priuses. The company announced on 20 February that "Prii" was the most popular choice, and the new official plural designation in the US.

In Latin prius is the neuter singular of the comparative form (prior, prior, prius) of an adjective with only comparative and superlative (the superlative being primus, prima, primum). As with all neuter words, the Latin plural is priora, but that brand name was used by the Lada Priora in 2007. Despite the "official" plural form used by Toyota USA, "Priuses" is widely used in English.

Beginning in September 2011, Toyota USA began using the following names to differentiate the original Prius from some newer members of the Prius family: the standard Prius became the Prius Liftback, the Prius v (known as the Prius α in Japan, and Prius + in Europe), the Prius Plug-in Hybrid, and the Prius c (called Toyota Aqua in Japan).

First generation (XW10; 1997)

NHW10 (1997–2000) 

In 1995, Toyota debuted a hybrid concept car at the Tokyo Motor Show, with testing following a year later. The first Prius, model NHW10, went on sale on 10 December 1997. The first-generation Prius (NHW10) was available only in Japan.

The first-generation Prius, at its launch, became the world's first mass-produced gasoline-electric hybrid car. At its introduction in 1997, it won the Car of the Year Japan Award, and in 1998, it won the Automotive Researchers' and Journalists' Conference Car of the Year award in Japan.

Production commenced in December 1997 at the Takaoka plant in Toyota, Aichi, ending in February 2000 after cumulative production of 37,425 vehicles.

The NHW10 Prius styling originated from California designers, who were selected over competing designs from other Toyota design studios.

NHW11 (2000–2003) 
The Prius NHW11 (sometimes referred to as "Generation II") was the first Prius sold by Toyota outside of Japan, with sales in limited numbers beginning in the year 2000 in Asia, America, Europe and Australia. European sales began in September 2000. The official launch of the Prius in Australia occurred at the October 2001 Sydney Motor Show, although sales were slow until the NHW20 (XW20) model arrived. Toyota sold about 123,000 first-generation Priuses.

Production of the NHW11 model commenced in May 2000 at the Motomachi plant in Toyota, Aichi, and continued until June 2003 after 33,411 NHW11 vehicles had been produced. The vehicle was the second mass-produced hybrid on the American market, after the two-seat Honda Insight.

The NHW11 Prius became more powerful partly to satisfy the higher speeds and longer distances that Americans drive. Air conditioning and electric power steering were standard equipment. While the larger Prius could seat five, its battery pack restricted cargo space. The Prius was offered in the US in three trim packages: Standard, Base, and Touring. The US EPA (CARB) classified the car with an air pollution score of 3 out of 10 as an Ultra Low Emission Vehicle (ULEV). Prius owners were eligible for up to a  federal tax deduction from their gross income. Toyota executives stated that with the Prius NHW10 model, the company had been losing money on each Prius sold, and with the NHW11 it was now breaking even.

Second generation (XW20; 2003) 

Presented at the April 2003 New York International Auto Show, for the 2004 US model year, the NHW20 Prius was a complete redesign. It became a compact liftback, sized between the Corolla and the Camry, with redistributed mechanical and interior space significantly increasing rear-seat legroom and luggage room. The second-generation Prius is more environmentally friendly than the previous model (according to the EPA), and is  longer than the previous version. The development effort, led by chief engineer Shigeyuki Hori, led to 530 patents for the vehicle.

Production commenced in August 2003 at the Tsutsumi plant in Toyota, Aichi, supplemented in October 2004 with the Fujimatsu plant at Kariya, Aichi.

The Prius uses an all-electric A/C compressor for cooling, an industry first. Combined with a smaller and lighter NiMH battery, the XW20 is more powerful and more efficient than the XW10.

It is classified as a SULEV (Super Ultra Low Emissions Vehicle) and is certified by California Air Resources Board as an "Advanced Technology Partial Zero Emission Vehicle" (AT-PZEV).

From 2005 to 2009, the second-generation Prius had been built by FAW Toyota in the city of Changchun for the Chinese market. It was reported that a total of 2,152 Priuses were sold in 2006 and 414 in 2007. The relatively low sales were blamed on high price, about  higher than the equivalent in Japan or the US, caused by high duties on imported parts.
It was thought that the sales dropped as a result of both a lack of acceptance and increased competition. The Toyota Prius Hybrid was exported to China from 2007. Toyota sold about 1,192,000-second-generation Priuses worldwide.

Third generation (XW30; 2009) 

Toyota debuted the new Prius (2010 US model year) at the January 2009 North American International Auto Show, and sales began in Japan on 18 May 2009. Competition from lower priced hybrids, such as the Honda Insight, also made it difficult for Toyota to capitalize on the Prius's success. , Toyota has sold about 1,688,000 third-generation Priuses worldwide.

Among the new standard features of the Prius, Toyota introduced three user-selectable driving modes: EV mode for electric-only low-speed operation, Eco mode for best fuel efficiency, and Power mode for better performance. Optional features included the solar-PV roof panels to help cool the cabin interior in summer heat, Intelligent Parking Assist, Lane Keep Assist, and Dynamic Radar Cruise Control.

Its new body design features a reduced . This figure was disputed by General Motors which found the value for the model with 17-inch wheels to be around 0.30 based on tests in GM, Ford, and Chrysler wind tunnels. Car & Driver measured the third-generation Prius at 0.26 in a privately arranged five-way wind-tunnel test of comparable cars. An underbody rear fin helps stabilize the vehicle at higher speeds.

A new front-drive platform underpinned the car, although the wheelbase remained unchanged and overall length grew by a lone centimetre. Aluminium was employed in the hood, rear hatch, front axle and brake calipers (disc brakes were finally assigned to all four wheels).

The Prius uses a range of plant-derived ecological bioplastics, using wood or grass-derived cellulose instead of petroleum. The two principal crops used are kenaf and ramie. Kenaf is a member of the hibiscus family, a relative to cotton and okra; ramie, commonly known as China grass, is a member of the nettle family and one of the strongest natural fibres, with a density and absorbency comparable to flax. Toyota said this was a timely breakthrough for plant-based eco-plastics because 2009 was the United Nations' International Year of Natural Fibres, which spotlights kenaf and ramie among others.

Awards

At its introduction in 2009, it won the Car of the Year Japan Award for the second time. In December 2013, Consumer Reports named the Prius as the "Best Value", for the second year in a row.

A 2019 iSeeCars study ranked the Prius as the second longest-kept vehicle among U.S. drivers.

Fourth generation (XW50; 2015) 

The fourth-generation Prius was first shown during September 2015 in Las Vegas, and was released for retail customers in Japan on 9 December 2015. The launch in the North American market occurred in January 2016, and February in Europe.

In August 2013, Toyota Managing Officer Satoshi Ogiso, who was chief engineer for the Prius line, announced some of the improvements and key features of the next generation Prius. This was the first generation of the Prius to use the Toyota New Global Architecture (TNGA) modular platform, which provides a lower center of gravity and increased structural rigidity. Ogiso also explained that the next-generation Prius plug-in hybrid, the Prius Prime, was developed in parallel with the standard Prius model.

2018 facelift

In late November 2018, for the 2019 model year, the U.S. market Prius lineup introduced an all-wheel drive model featuring Toyota's E-Four system. This has been available for the Japanese market Prius since 2015 and the hybrid versions of the RAV4 and Lexus NX. Also, the Prius received a facelift with redesigned headlights and tail lights, which was released in Japan on 17 December 2018.

In 2021, for the 2022 model year, Toyota released the Nightshade Edition in the US. Like other Nightshade models, it added black paint to exterior trim pieces.  It was available in FWD or AWD-e powertrain and in three exterior colours.

Fifth generation (XW60; 2022) 

The fifth-generation Prius was unveiled on 16 November 2022, with two powertrain options announced for the Japanese market. This model is also available with E-Four all-wheel drive system.

In Europe, deliveries will begin in the first quarter of 2023, with only the plug-in hybrid model being available.

Unlike previous generations, this generation will not be sold in Australia, New Zealand or the UK due to sluggish sales with the previous generation. It will be replaced by a shorter Corolla Hatchback Hybrid.

Markets

Japan 
In Japan, the Prius went on sale on 10 January 2023.

North America 
The North American market Prius is available in three grade levels: LE, XLE, and Limited. All grades are powered with the M20A-FXS engine; AWD is optional on all trims.

Prius family

Prius Plug-in Hybrid 

A global demonstration program involving 600 pre-production test cars began in late 2009 and took place in Japan, Europe, Canada, China, Australia, New Zealand and the United States.

The production version was unveiled at the September 2011 Frankfurt Motor Show. Deliveries began in Japan in late January 2012, followed by a limited roll-out in the U.S. in late February. Deliveries began in Europe in June 2012 and in the UK in August 2012. During its first year in the market, global sales reached 27,181 Prius PHVs, making the Prius PHV the second top selling plug-in electric car in 2012 after the Chevrolet Volt. Production of the first generation Prius Plug-in hybrid ended in June 2015. , cumulative sales of the first generation Prius PHVs totaled 75,400 units delivered worldwide. The United States led sales with 42,345 units delivered through September 2016, followed by Japan with 22,100 units, and Europe with 10,600 units, both through January 2017. , global sales of both Prius plug-in generations totaled 209,000 units since inception, making the Prius PHV the world's all-time second best selling plug-in hybrid after the Mitsubishi Outlander PHEV.

Prius Prime 

The second generation of the plug-in hybrid version of the Prius, called Toyota Prius Prime in the U.S. and Prius PHV in Japan, was developed in parallel with the standard fourth generation Prius model (XW50) released in December 2015. The model was released to retail customers in the U.S. in November 2016, followed by Japan in February 2017. In the American market, unlike the first generation model, the Prius Prime will be available in all 50 states. Cumulative global sales of both Prius plug-in generations totaled 79,300 units at the end of January 2017. The U.S. is the top selling market, with 46,133 units sold since inception through January 2017, of which, 3,788 units are second generation Prius Prime cars.

Unlike its predecessor, the Prime runs entirely on electricity in charge-depleting mode (EV mode). Toyota targeted the fuel economy in hybrid mode to be equal or better than standard fourth generation Prius liftbacks. Only the Prius Eco has a higher EPA-rated fuel economy rating in hybrid mode. The 2017 model year Prime has a different exterior design than the fourth generation Prius. The interior design is also different. Up until the 2020 model year, the Prime only had four seats as Toyota couldn't meet efficiency targets when seating a fifth person.

Prius v 

At the January 2011 North American International Auto Show, Toyota revealed the 2012 model year Prius v, an MPV, which is derived from the third-generation Prius and features over 50 per cent more interior cargo space than the original Prius design.

In May 2011, Toyota introduced the Prius α (alpha) in Japan, which is available in a five-seat, two-row model and a seven-seat, three-row model, the latter's third row enabled by a space-saving lithium-ion drive battery in the center console. The five-seat model uses a NiMH battery pack. The Alpha is the basis for the five-seat Prius v launched in North America in October 2011 with a nickel-metal hydride battery pack similar to the 2010 model year Prius, and with two rows of seats to accommodate five passengers. The European and Japanese versions are offered with a lithium-ion battery, with three rows of seats with accommodations for seven passengers. However, the seven passenger seating on the Prius v is not available on North American Prius v models. The European version, named Prius+ (plus), began deliveries in June 2012. Global sales totaled 671,200 units . Japan is the leading market with 446,400 units sold, followed by North America with 173,100 units, and Europe with 43,800, all through January 2017.

US sales ended in 2017. Japanese production ended in March 2021.

Prius c 

Toyota unveiled the Prius c concept at the January 2011 North American International Auto Show. The Prius c has a lower list price and is smaller than the previous Prius liftback. The production version was unveiled at the 2011 Tokyo Motor Show as the Toyota Aqua, and was launched in Japan in December 2011. The Prius c was released in the US and Canada in March 2012, and in April 2012 in Australia and New Zealand. The Prius c is not available in Europe, where instead, Toyota is selling the Toyota Yaris Hybrid since June 2012. The Prius c and the Yaris Hybrid share the same powertrain. The Aqua ranked as the second best selling car in Japan in 2012 after the Prius brand, as Toyota reports together sales of the conventional Prius and the Prius α. When sales of these two Prius models are broken down, the Toyota Aqua ranked as the top selling model in Japan, including kei cars, with the Aqua leading monthly sales since February through December 2012. Thereafter, the Aqua has been the top selling new car in Japan for three years running, from 2013 to 2015, and it is considered the most successful nameplate launch in Japan in the last 20 years.

Global sales of the Aqua/Prius c passed the 500,000 mark in August 2013. and the 1 million milestone during the first half of 2015. , with 1,380,100 units sold worldwide, the Aqua/Prius c is the second top selling TMC hybrid after the regular Prius. The top market is Japan with 1,154,500 Aquas sold, capturing 83.6% of global sales, followed by North America with 192,700 units.

Sales

Overview 
, the Prius is sold in over 90 countries and regions. Worldwide cumulative sales of the Prius passed the 1 million mark in May 2008, exceeded 2 million units in September 2010, and reached the 3 million milestone in June 2013. , global sales of the Prius family totaled almost 6.115 million units representing 61% of the 10 million hybrids delivered by Toyota Motor Company (TMC) worldwide, including the Lexus brand. Sales of the Prius family are led by the Prius liftback with 3.985 million units, followed by the Aqua/Prius c with 1.38 million, the Prius +/v/α with, 614.7 thousand and the Prius Plug-in Hybrid with 79.3 thousand units.

, the US accounted for almost half of Prius liftback global sales, with 1 million Priuses sold since 2000. However, the Prius experienced two consecutive years of sales decreases from its peak in 2007, falling to 139,682 units in 2009 before rebounding to 140,928 units in 2010. Sales in Japan reached 1 million Priuses in August 2011. , sales of the Prius liftback totaled over 1.8 million units in Japan and 1.75 million in the United States, and ranked as the all-time best-selling hybrid car in both countries.

2010
Cumulative Prius sales in Europe reach 100,000 in 2008 and 200,000 units by mid-2010, after 10 years on that market. The UK is one of the leading European markets for Prius, accounting more than 20 percent of all Priuses sold in Europe. Toyota Prius became Japan's best selling vehicle in 2009 for the first time since its debut in 1997 as its sales almost tripled to 208,876 in 2009. In that year it overtook the Honda Fit, which was Japan's best-selling car in 2008 excluding Kei cars.

2011
Rising oil prices caused by the Arab Spring led to increased sales of the Prius in the first quarter of 2011, but the 2011 Tōhoku earthquake and tsunami led to a production stoppage. Production restarted several days later, but output was hindered due to shortages from parts suppliers. Nevertheless, during the 2011 Japanese fiscal year (1 April 2011 through 31 March 2012), the Prius family sold 310,484 units, including sales of the Prius α, launched in May 2011, and the Toyota Aqua, launched in December, allowing the Prius brand to become the best-selling vehicle in Japan for the third consecutive year.

2012
Until September 2012, The Prius liftback was the top selling new car in Japan for 16 months in a row, until it was surpassed by the Toyota Aqua in October, which kept the lead through December 2012. The Prius liftback, with 317,675 units sold in 2012 (including sales of the Prius α), was the best selling car in Japan during the 2012 calendar year for the fourth consecutive year. The Aqua ranked as the second best selling car with 266,567 units sold in 2012. Nevertheless, when sales of the two Prius models are broken down, the Toyota Aqua ranked as the top selling model in Japan in 2012, including kei cars, leading sales since February through December 2012. The Aqua was the top selling new car in Japan in 2013, and again in 2014. Global Prius sales peaked in 2010 with over 500 thousand units sold, and since 2011 sales of the liftback version have declined in most markets through December 2015, and in the US and Canada since 2013.

High gasoline prices in the US, approaching  a gallon by March 2012, contributed to record monthly sales of the Prius family vehicles. A total of 28,711 units were sold in the United States during March 2012, becoming the one-month record for Prius sales ever. The third-generation Prius liftback accounted for 18,008 units (62.7%); the Prius v accounted for 4,937 units (17.2%); the Prius c, for 4,875 units (17.0%); and the Prius Plug-in Hybrid, for 891 units (3.1%). Another record was set during the first quarter of 2012, with Prius family sales of 60,859 units, it became the best selling quarter ever. Sales of Toyota Prius family vehicles in California represented 26% of all Prius purchases in the US during 2012. With 60,688 units sold during this year, the Prius became the best selling vehicle in California, ahead of the previous leader, the Honda Civic (57,124 units) and the third ranked, the Toyota Camry (50,250 units). The Prius nameplate was again in 2013 the best selling vehicle in California with 69,728 units sold in the state, ahead of the Honda Civic (66,982) and the Honda Accord (63,194).

Toyota sold 223,905 Priuses among the various HEV family members in the US in 2012, representing together a market share of 51.5% of all hybrid sold in the country that year. In addition, a total of 12,750 Prius PHVs were sold in 2012, allowing the plug-in hybrid to rank as the second top selling plug-in electric car in the US after the Chevrolet Volt, and surpassing the Nissan Leaf. The Toyota Prius liftback, with 147,503 units sold, was the best selling hybrid in 2012, the Prius v ranked third with 40,669 units, and the Prius c was fourth with 35,733 units. Toyota USA estimated that sales of its hybrids models in 2012 would represent 14% of total Toyota sales in the country. Since their inception in 1999, a total of 1.5 million Prius family members have been sold in the US by mid October 2013, representing a 50.1% market share of total hybrid sales in the country. Of these, 1,356,318 are conventional Prius liftbacks sold through September 2013.

Prius family sales also set a record in Japan in March 2012. Accounting for the conventional Prius and Prius α sales, a total of 45,496 units were sold in March 2012, becoming the highest monthly sales ever for any model in Japan since 1997, and representing a market share of 9% of all new car registrations excluding kei cars. The Toyota Aqua sold 29,156 units, ranking as the third top selling car that month. Together, all Prius family vehicles sold 74,652 units, representing 15% of monthly new car sales in March 2012. With a total of 247,230 vehicles sold during the first quarter of 2012, the Toyota Prius family became the third top selling nameplate in the world in terms of total global sales, after the Toyota Corolla (300,800 units) and the Ford Focus (277,000 units).

Since 2012
US Prius sales have declined every year since their peak in 2012, due to more competition from other manufacturers.

Liftback sales

Sales of non-liftback 

The following table presents retail sales of the other vehicles of the Prius family by year since deliveries began in 2011 through December 2016.

Design and technology 

The Prius is a power-split or series-parallel (full) hybrid, sometimes referred to as a combined hybrid, a vehicle that can be propelled by gasoline or electric power or both. Wind resistance is reduced by a  (0.29 for 2000 model) with a Kammback design to reduce air resistance. Lower rolling-resistance tires are used to reduce road friction. An electric water pump eliminates serpentine belts. In the US and Canada, a vacuum flask is used to store hot coolant when the vehicle is powered off for reuse so as to reduce warm-up time. The Prius engine makes use of the Atkinson cycle.

EV mode 
When the vehicle is turned on with the "Power" button, it is ready to drive immediately with the electric motor. In the North American second generation Prius, electric pumps warm the engine by pumping previously saved hot engine coolant from a coolant thermos before the internal combustion engine is started. The delay between powering the car on and starting the internal combustion engine is a few seconds. The third generation Prius does not have a coolant thermos. Instead, the engine is heated by recapturing exhaust heat. This permits driving with low noise and no fuel consumption for journeys under , Longer journeys are possible as long as the speed is kept below , acceleration is kept low and the battery has enough charge. The engine starts automatically when the battery starts to run low. Prior to the 2010 model, the North American model did not have the "EV" button, although one can be added to enable the "EV" mode supported internally by the Prius Hybrid Vehicle management computer. For the North American market, the third generation can remain in EV mode until  depending on throttle and road gradient.

Batteries 

There are two batteries: the high voltage (HV) battery pack, also known as the traction battery, and a 12-volt battery known as the low voltage (LV) battery. The traction battery of the first generation Prius update (2000 onwards) was a sealed 38-module nickel metal hydride (NiMH) battery pack with a capacity of 1.78kWh at a voltage of 273.6V, and weighing  and is supplied by Japan's Panasonic EV Energy Co. They are normally charged between 40 and 60% of maximum capacity to prolong battery life as well as allow headroom for regenerative braking. Each battery pack uses  of lanthanum, and each Prius electric motor contains  of neodymium; production of the car is described as "the biggest user of rare earths of any object in the world." The LV battery provides power to the computer and various accessories such as wiper motors, headlights etc.

The Second Generation Prius contains a 1.310kWh battery, composed of 28 modules. Each battery module is made of six individual 1.2V 6.5Ah Prismatic NiMH cells in series forming a 7.2V 6.5Ah module with 46Wh/kg energy density and 1.3kW/kg output power density. Each module contains an integrated charge controller and relay. These modules are connected 28 in series to form a 201.6V 6.5Ah battery (traction battery), also known as the energy storage system. The computer-controlled charge controller and battery management computer systems keep this battery between 38% and 82% state of charge, with a tendency to keep the average state of charge around 60%. By shallow cycling the battery, only a small portion of its net available energy storage capacity is available for use (approximately 400Wh) by the hybrid drive system, but the shallow computer-controlled cycling dramatically improves the cycle life, thermal management control, and net long term calendar life of the battery. Active cooling of this battery is achieved by a blower motor and air ducting, while passive thermal management was accomplished through the metal case design.

Battery life cycle 
As the Prius reached ten years of being available in the US market, in February 2011 Consumer Reports examined the lifetime and replacement cost of the Prius battery. The comparison showed little difference in performance when tested for fuel economy and acceleration. Overall fuel economy of the 2001 model was  while the 2002 Prius with high mileage delivered . The magazine concluded that the effectiveness of the battery has not degraded over the long run. One study indicates it may be worthwhile to rebuild batteries using good blades from defective used batteries.

Air conditioning (HVAC) 
The HVAC system uses an AC induction motor to drive a sealed-system scroll compressor, a design principle not usually used in automotive applications. Using a scroll compressor increases the efficiency of the system while driving it with an AC induction motor makes the system more flexible, so the AC can run while the engine is off. Because the oil used with the refrigerant gas also flows in the area of the high-voltage motor-windings, the fluid must be electrically insulating to avoid transmitting electric current to exposed metal parts of the system. Therefore, Toyota specifies that a polyolester (POE) oil (designated ND11) is required for repairs. The system cannot be serviced with equipment normally employed for regular cars, which typically use polyalkylene glycol (PAG) oil, as the equipment would contaminate the ND11 oil with PAG oil. According to SAE J2843, the oil provided from maintenance equipment must contain less than 0.1% PAG when filling. One percent PAG oil may result in an electrical resistance drop by a factor of about 10.

Environmental impact

Fuel economy and emissions 
United States

Since its introduction, the Toyota Prius has been among the best fuel economy vehicles available in the United States, and for the model year 2012, the Prius family has three models among the 10 most fuel-efficient cars sold in the country as rated by US Environmental Protection Agency (EPA). After the Honda Insight first generation was discontinued in September 2006, the Prius liftback became the most fuel-efficient car sold in the American market,
According to the EPA, for the model year 2012, and when only gasoline-powered vehicles are considered (excluding all-electric cars), the Prius c ranks as the most fuel-efficient compact car, the Prius liftback as the most fuel-efficient mid-size car, and the Prius v as the most fuel-efficient mid-size station wagon.

More fossil fuel is needed to build hybrid vehicles than conventional cars but reduced emissions when running the vehicle more than outweigh this.

Japan
The following table presents fuel economy performance and carbon emissions for all Prius family models sold in Japan since 1997. The ratings are presented for both, the older official 10-15 mode cycle test and the new JC08 test designed for Japan's new standards that went into effect in 2015, but was already being used by several car manufacturers for new cars. The Prius 2nd generation became the first car to meet Japan's new 2015 Fuel Economy Standards measured under the JC08 test.

Lifetime energy usage 
In 2008, the British government and British media requested that Toyota release detailed figures for the energy use and  emissions resulting from the building and disposal of the Prius. Toyota has not supplied the requested data to address statements that the lifetime energy usage of the Prius (including the increased environmental cost of manufacture and disposal of the nickel-metal hydride battery) is outweighed by lower lifetime fuel consumption.
Toyota states that lifetime  saving is 43 percent. , the UK Government Car Service operated over 100 Priuses (the largest part of its fleet) and lists the Prius as having the lowest  emissions among its fleet.

CNW Marketing Research initially published a study in which they estimated that the total lifetime energy cost of a 2005 Prius was greater than that of a Hummer H2. The study has been widely debunked: see for example, "Hummer versus Prius: 'Dust to Dust' Report Misleads the Media and Public with Bad Science".

Electromagnetic field levels 

The Prius uses electric motors in the hybrid propulsion systems, powered by a high voltage battery in the rear of the car. There has been some public concern over whether the levels of electromagnetic field exposure within the cabin are higher than comparable cars, and what health effects those fields may present, popularized by a 2008 The New York Times article. However, Toyota and several independent studies
have indicated that aside from a brief spike when accelerating, the electromagnetic fields within the Prius are no different from those of a conventional car and do not exceed the ICNIRP exposure guidelines.

A 2013 study by the Mayo Clinic found that patients with implanted cardiac devices such as pacemakers and defibrillators can safely drive or ride in hybrids or plug-in electric cars without risk of electromagnetic interference (EMI). The research was conducted using implantable devices from the three major manufacturers and a 2012 Toyota Prius hybrid. The study used 30 participants with implanted devices and measured electric and magnetic fields in six positions inside and outside the Prius, and each position was evaluated at different speeds.

Quietness 

The Wall Street Journal reported in February 2007 on concerns that quiet cars like the Prius may pose a safety risk to pedestrians who rely on engine noise to sense the presence or location of moving vehicles. Blind pedestrians are a primary concern, and the National Federation of the Blind advocates audio emitters on hybrid vehicles, but it has been argued that increased risks may also affect sighted pedestrians or bicyclists who are accustomed to aural cues from vehicles. However, silent vehicles are already relatively common, and there is also a lack of aural cues from vehicles that have a conventional internal combustion engine where engine noise has been reduced by noise-absorbing materials in the engine bay and noise-cancelling muffler systems. In July 2007, a spokesman for Toyota said the company is aware of the issue and is studying options.

In 2010, Toyota released a device for the third-generation Prius meant to alert pedestrians of its proximity. Japan issued guidelines for such warning devices in January 2010 and the US approved legislation in December 2010. Models equipped with automatically activated systems include all 2012 and later model year Prius family vehicles that have been introduced in the United States, including the standard Prius, the Prius v, the Prius c and the Toyota Prius Plug-in Hybrid.

Marketing and culture

advertising 
In the UK, the Advertising Standards Authority, an independent body charged with policing the rules of the advertising industry, ruled that a television advert for the Toyota Prius should not be broadcast again in the same form, having breached rules concerning misleading advertising. Average calculated on 20,000km a year."

Political symbolism 

The large number of Prius-owning progressive celebrities in 2002 prompted The Washington Post to dub hybrids "Hollywood's latest politically correct status symbol". Conservatives called "Prius Patriots" also drive the cars because they want to contribute to reducing US dependence on foreign oil. A 2007 San Francisco Chronicle article said "Prius Progressives" were becoming an archetype, with American conservative commentator Rush Limbaugh opining that "these liberals think they're ahead of the game on these things, and they're just suckers".

In July 2007, The New York Times published an article using data from CNW Marketing Research finding that 57% of Prius buyers said their main reason for buying was that "it makes a statement about me", while just 37% cited fuel economy as a prime motivator. Shortly afterwards Washington Post columnist Robert Samuelson coined the term "Prius politics" to describe a situation where the driver's desire to "show off" is a stronger motivator than the desire to curb greenhouse gas emissions. Some conservatives promote the use of the Toyota Prius and other hybrid cars. For example, Jim Road from What Would Jesus Drive? encouraged people to drive hybrid cars because of the damage that large SUVs and faster cars can do to others.

Former Central Intelligence Agency (CIA) chief R. James Woolsey, Jr. drives a Prius because of its low fuel consumption. Woolsey noted the volatility of the Middle East, coupled with anti-US sentiment in much of the region. Noting that the high percentage of oil drilled in the Middle East gives vast profits to Middle Eastern regimes, Woolsey believes that it is a patriotic obligation to drive more efficient vehicles. In a Motor Trend magazine article, Woolsey stated that those oil profits find their way to terrorist groups like al-Qaeda, meaning that Americans who buy inefficient vehicles would, in effect, be indirectly funding terrorism. "We're paying for both sides in this war, and that's not a good long-term strategy," said Woolsey. "I have a bumper sticker on the back of my Prius that reads, 'Bin Laden hates this car.'"

DARPA driverless edition 
A driverless version of the Prius was one of six cars to finish the 2007 DARPA Urban Challenge.

Motorsports 

A racing version of the Prius was unveiled by Toyota in 2013. This racing Prius replaces the 1.8-litre Atkinson-cycle engine with a 3.4-litre V8 RV8KLM engine which is mid-mounted in the car (the engine was later moved to the front in 2019 due to GT300 regulation changes). The hybrid drive train of the car's production Hybrid Synergy Drive is retained but with a larger lithium ion battery. The RV8KLM is in fact the same engine featured in multiple Le Mans Prototypes such as the Lola B12/60 and Rebellion R-One. The car took class pole position and finished sixth at the 2012 Fuji GT 500km.

Government and corporate incentives 

There have been a number of governments with incentives intended to encourage hybrid car sales. In some countries, including the US and Canada, some rebate incentives have been exhausted, while other countries such as the United Kingdom, Sweden, Belgium, and the Netherlands have various or alternative incentives to purchasing a hybrid vehicle.

Several US companies offer employees incentives. Bank of America will reimburse  on the purchase of new hybrid vehicles to full- and part-time associates working more than 20 hours per week. Google, software company Hyperion Solutions, and
organic food and drink producer Clif Bar & Co offer employees a  credit toward their purchase of certain hybrid vehicles including the Prius. Integrated Archive Systems, a Palo Alto IT company, offers a  subsidy toward the purchase of hybrid vehicles to full-time employees employed more than one year.

Travelers Companies, a large insurance company, offers hybrid owners a 10% discount on auto insurance in most US states. The Farmers Insurance Group offers a similar discount of up to 10% in most US states.

In June 2015, the Prius started use as a general purpose patrol car of the National Police of Ukraine. In return for Ukrainian emissions permits under the Kyoto Protocol, 1,568 cars were supplied by Japan.

See also 
 Comparison of Toyota hybrids

References

External links 

 Toyota Prius global site
 

 
Cars introduced in 1997
2000s cars
2010s cars
2020s cars
Subcompact cars
Compact cars
Sedans
Hatchbacks
Front-wheel-drive vehicles
All-wheel-drive vehicles
Hybrid electric cars
Partial zero-emissions vehicles
Taxi vehicles
Euro NCAP large family cars